Güldere can refer to:

 Güldere, Düzce
 Güldere, Vezirköprü